The People's Action Party is a major conservative centre-right political party in Singapore.

People's Action Party may also refer to:

People's Action Party, Cameroon; see Paul Abine Ayah
People's Action Party (Ghana)

People's Action Party or Niue People's Party
People's Action Party (Papua New Guinea)
People's Action Party or People's Action (Romania)

People's Action Party (Vanuatu)
People's Action Party of Vietnam, an exile group